The Irish Cave Rescue Organisation (ICRO) is a voluntary body responsible for cave and abandoned mine rescues within the island of Ireland.

The rescue organisation has 100 members, including general members who are available to help in any situation and those who have specific skills to assist a rescue, such as first-aid training and the ability to rig a cave.

Funding
The organisation was previously funded by the Northern Ireland Mountain, Cliff and Cave Rescue Coordinating Committee (through Sport Northern Ireland and the Department of Culture, Arts and Leisure) and the Irish Coast Guard.

It is now is funded by the Northern Ireland Department of Justice and a member of the Northern Ireland Search & Rescue Policy Group and the Northern Ireland Search & Rescue Practitioners Group.

Affiliations 
ICRO is affiliated with the Speleological Union of Ireland (SUI), collectively they are known as SUICRO, as well as the British Cave Rescue Council. If needed, additional rescuers from Britain can be called in with specialised skills, such as for the recovery of Artur Kozłowski in 2011.

ICRO has representatives on the National Co-ordinating Committee for Mountain and Cave Rescue (NCCMCR) in the Republic of Ireland and the Northern Ireland Mountain Rescue Co-ordinating Committee (NIMRCC).

Training
ICRO carries out major rescue training exercises throughout the year, and additional specialist training in areas
such as rescue rigging, rope skills, stretcher handling, communications, wilderness first aid and casualty care. Once a year an extended overnight rescue training exercise takes place, replicating the reality and duration of a real cave rescue incident. Through the British Cave Rescue Council, ICRO has access to training in rescue techniques in Britain.

See also 
 Mountain Rescue Ireland

References

External links 
 Official website of SUICRO (Speleological Union of Ireland & Irish Cave Rescue Organisation)

Cave rescue organizations
All-Ireland organisations
Cave Rescue
Volunteer search and rescue in the United Kingdom
1961 establishments in Ireland
Organizations established in 1961